Robert Karśnicki (born 20 May 1972) is a Polish former cyclist. He competed at the 1992 Summer Olympics and the 1996 Summer Olympics.

References

External links
 

1972 births
Living people
Polish male cyclists
Olympic cyclists of Poland
Cyclists at the 1992 Summer Olympics
Cyclists at the 1996 Summer Olympics
Sportspeople from Łódź
Polish track cyclists